The 2019 AFL Women's best and fairest was the award presented to the player adjudged the best and fairest player during the 2019 AFL Women's season. Erin Phillips of the Adelaide Football Club won the award for the second time, winning with 19 votes.

Leading votegetters

Voting procedure
The three field umpires (the umpires who control the flow of the game, as opposed to goal or boundary umpires) confer after each match and award three votes, two votes and one vote to the players they regard as the best, second-best and third-best in the match, respectively. The votes are kept secret until the awards night, and are read and tallied on the evening.

References

2019 AFL Women's season
AFL Women's awards